Bhimavaram mandal is one of the 19 mandals in West Godavari district of the Indian state of Andhra Pradesh. It has headquarters at Bhimavaram town. The mandal is bounded by Undi mandal, Palcoderu mandal, Veeravasaram mandal, Narasapuram mandal, Mogalthur mandal and Kalla mandal mandals.

Demographics 

 census, the mandal had a population of 226,497. The total population constitute, 112,283 males and 114,214 females —a sex ratio of 1017 females per 1000 males. 20,991 children are in the age group of 0–6 years, of which 10,596 are boys and 10,395 are girls. The average literacy rate stands at 79.59% with 163,561 literates.

Government and politics 

Bhimavaram mandal is one of the 2 mandals under Bhimavaram (Assembly constituency), which in turn represents Narasapuram (Lok Sabha constituency) of Andhra Pradesh. The present MLA representing Bhimavaram (Assembly constituency) is Grandhi Srinivasa Rao of YCP Party, who won the Andhra Pradesh Legislative Assembly election of 2019.

Towns and villages 

 census, the mandal has 15 settlements, which includes 1 town and 14 villages. Chinamiram and Rayalam are partly OGs to Bhimavaram (M). Losarigutlapadu village is the most populated and Annavaram village is the least populated settlement in the mandal.

The settlements in the mandal are listed below:

Notes
(M) denotes a Municipality
 Chinaamiram and Rayalam (part) are partly outgrowths to Bhimavaram (M)

See also 
 West Godavari district
 Bhimavaram

References

Mandals in West Godavari district